At the 1904 Summer Olympics, in St. Louis, diving debuted as an official two-event Olympic sport. The competitions were held on Monday, 5 September 1904 and on Wednesday, 6 September 1904.  It included the only Olympic appearance of the plunge for distance event.

Medal summary

Participating nations
A total of ten divers from two nations competed at the St. Louis Games:

Medal table

References

Sources
 

 
1904 Summer Olympics events
1904
1904 in diving